"I Send a Message" was the second single released by Australian rock band INXS from their fourth album The Swing.
The music video was directed by Yamamoto San and filmed in Tokyo at the city's oldest Buddhist temple in Main Old City Park.

Cash Box called the song "a powerful dance cut" with a "frenetic back beat" and "staccato vocal."

At the 1984 Countdown Music Awards, the song was nominated for Best Australian Single.

Track listing
7" single Track listing

12"/CD Maxi single Track listing

Charts
The song was released on 12 March 1984 and reached No.3 on the ARIA Charts. It also reached No.18 on the New Zealand Singles charts, No. 18 on the US Billboard Dance Music/Club Play Singles and No. 77 on The Billboard Hot 100.

Weekly charts

Year-end charts

References

INXS songs
1984 singles
Songs written by Andrew Farriss
Songs written by Michael Hutchence
Song recordings produced by Nile Rodgers
1983 songs
Warner Music Group singles